Plaza Guadalajara is an urban square in Centro, Guadalajara, in the Mexican state of Jalisco.

References

External links

 

Centro, Guadalajara
Plazas in Jalisco